Earlham College Observatory is a historic observatory building located on the campus of Earlham College at Richmond, Wayne County, Indiana.  It was built in 1861, and is a one-story, brick building with a hipped roof.  It consists of a 19-foot-square central section topped by a copper dome with a removable section, and flanked by 10-foot by 19-foot sections.  Beneath the revolvable dome is a -inch objective lens telescope located in the center of the main block.

It was listed on the National Register of Historic Places in 1975.

See also
 List of astronomical observatories

References

External links

Historic American Buildings Survey in Indiana
Astronomical observatories in Indiana
University and college buildings on the National Register of Historic Places in Indiana
Victorian architecture in Indiana
Buildings and structures completed in 1861
Buildings and structures in Richmond, Indiana
National Register of Historic Places in Wayne County, Indiana
1861 establishments in Indiana
Earlham College